Judy Rising Reinke is an American diplomat and the United States Ambassador to Montenegro.

Education
Reinke received a Bachelor of Arts degree from Smith College and a Master of Public Affairs from the Woodrow Wilson School at Princeton University in 1983.

Career
Ms. Reinke is a career member of the Foreign Commercial Service. She has been working as a strategist and advocate for the Commerce Department since 1983. She worked on missions across the world, primarily in Europe and Southeast Asia. She has served at multiple capacities including being the Deputy Director General of the United States and Foreign Commercial Service/Global Markets division. She has served at six United States Missions overseas, including leading the operations of the Foreign Commercial Service in India, the Philippines, and Thailand. She holds the rank of Career Minister in the Foreign Commercial Service.

United States Ambassador to Montenegro
On July 27, 2018, President Trump nominated Reinke to be the next United States Ambassador to Montenegro. On September 6, 2018, the Senate confirmed her nomination by voice vote. She presented her credentials to the President of Montenegro on December 20, 2018. Reinke is the first female foreign service officer from the Department of Commerce to be confirmed as Chief of Mission. In October, 2019, Reinke and the US Embassy hosted US Secretary of State Mike Pompeo, the first Secretary of State to visit Montenegro since its independence in 2006.

Personal life
Reinke is married to Edwin Reinke and has a daughter. She speaks German, French, Bahasa Indonesia and Thai.

See also
List of ambassadors of the United States
List of ambassadors appointed by Donald Trump

References 

Living people
Place of birth missing (living people)
Ambassadors of the United States to Montenegro
Princeton School of Public and International Affairs alumni
Smith College alumni
Year of birth missing (living people)
21st-century American diplomats
American women ambassadors
21st-century American women
American women diplomats